Mount Nichols is a mountain, 670 m, in the central part of the Harold Byrd Mountains. Mapped by United States Geological Survey (USGS) from ground surveys and U.S. Navy air photos, 1960–63. Named by Advisory Committee on Antarctic Names (US-ACAN) for William L. Nichols, construction mechanic with the Byrd Station winter party in 1957.

Mountains of Marie Byrd Land